Sanjay Gandhi (14 December 1946  23 June 1980) was an Indian politician and the younger son of Indira Gandhi and Feroze Gandhi. He was a member of parliament, Lok Sabha and the Nehru–Gandhi family. During his lifetime, he was widely expected to succeed his mother as head of the Indian National Congress and Prime Minister of India, but following his early death in a plane crash his elder brother Rajiv became their mother's political heir and succeeded her as Prime Minister of India and President of the party after her assassination. His wife Maneka Gandhi and son Varun Gandhi are politicians in the Bharatiya Janata Party.

Early life and education

Gandhi was born in New Delhi, on 14 December 1946, as the younger son of Indira Gandhi and Feroze Gandhi. Like his elder brother Rajiv, Gandhi was educated at St. Columba's School, Delhi,  Welham Boys' School, Dehra Dun and then at the Doon School, Dehra Dun. Gandhi was also educated at the Ecole D'Humanité, an international boarding school in Switzerland. Gandhi did not attend university, but took up automotive engineering as a career and underwent an apprenticeship with Rolls-Royce in Crewe, England for three years. He was very interested in sports cars, and also obtained a pilot's licence in 1976. He was interested in aircraft acrobatics and won several prizes in that sport. His brother was however a captain in Indian Airlines flying the Boeing 737-200ADV aircraft.

Maruti Limited controversy
In 1971, Prime Minister Indira Gandhi's cabinet proposed the production of a "People's car": an efficient indigenous car that middle-class Indians could afford. In June 1971, a company is known as Maruti Motors Limited (now Maruti Suzuki) was incorporated under the Companies Act and Gandhi became its managing director. While Gandhi had no previous experience, design proposals or links with any corporation, he was awarded the contract to build the car and the exclusive production licence. The criticism that followed this decision was mostly directed at Indira, but the 1971 Bangladesh Liberation War and grand victory over Pakistan muted the critical voices. The company did not produce any vehicles during his lifetime. A test model put out as a showpiece to demonstrate progress was criticized. Public perception turned against Gandhi, and many began to speculate about growing corruption. Gandhi then contacted Volkswagen AG from West Germany for a possible collaboration, transfer of technology and joint production of the Indian version of the "People's Car", to emulate Volkswagen's worldwide success with the Beetle. During the emergency, Gandhi became active in politics and the Maruti project went on the back burner. There were accusations of nepotism and corruption. Finally, the Janata Government came to power in 1977 and "Maruti Limited" was liquidated.  A commission was set up by the new government headed by Justice Alak Chandra Gupta which gave very critical report of the Maruti affair. A year after his death in 1980, and at the behest of Indira, the Union government salvaged Maruti Limited and started looking for an active collaborator for a new company. Maruti Udyog Ltd. was incorporated in the same year through the efforts of Nehru Gandhi family friend and industrial doyen V. Krishnamurthy. The Japanese company Suzuki was also contacted to present the design and feasibility of their car to be manufactured in India. When Suzuki learned that the Government of India had contacted Volkswagen as well, it did everything to pip the German company in the race to produce India's first People's Car (Maruti 800). It provided the government a feasible Design of their 'Model 796', which was also successful in Japan and East Asian countries.

Role during emergency

In 1974, the opposition-led protests and strikes had caused a widespread disturbance in many parts of the country and badly affected the government and the economy. On 25 June 1975 following an adverse court decision against her, Indira Gandhi declared a national emergency, delayed elections, censored the press and suspended some constitutional freedoms in the name of national security. Non-Congress governments throughout the country were dismissed. Thousands of people, including several freedom fighters like Jaya Prakash Narayan and Jivatram Kripalani who were against the Emergency were arrested.

In the extremely hostile political environment just before and soon after the Emergency, Gandhi rose in importance as Indira's adviser. With the defections of former loyalists, Gandhi's influence with Indira and the government increased dramatically, although he was never in an official or elected position. According to Mark Tully, "His inexperience did not stop him from using the Draconian powers his mother, Indira, had taken to terrorise the administration, setting up what was in effect a police state."

It was said that during the Emergency, he virtually ran India along with his friends, especially Bansi Lal. It was also quipped that Gandhi had total control over his mother and that the government was run by the PMH (Prime Minister House) rather than the PMO (Prime Minister Office).  He "recruited into the party thousands of younger people, many of them hooligans and ruffians, who used threats and force to intimidate rivals and those who opposed Mrs Gandhi's authority or his own."

During the emergency, Indira  declared a 20-point economic programme for development. Gandhi also declared his own much shorter five points program promoting
 Literacy
 Family planning
Tree Planting
 Eradication of Casteism 
 Abolition of dowry 
Later during the emergency Sanjay's programme was merged with Indira's 20-point programme to make a combined twenty-five point programme.

Out of the five points, Sanjay is now chiefly remembered for the family planning initiative that attracted much notoriety and caused longterm harm to population control in India.

Involvement in politics and government
Although he had not been elected and held no office, Sanjay began exercising his newfound influence with Cabinet ministers, high-level government officials and police officers. While many Cabinet ministers and officials resigned in protest, Sanjay reportedly appointed their successors.

In one famous example, Inder Kumar Gujral resigned from the Ministry of Information and Broadcasting when Sanjay attempted to direct the affairs of his ministry and give him orders. Gujral is reported to have angrily rebuked Sanjay and refused to take orders from an unelected person. Gujral was replaced by Vidya Charan Shukla, a Sanjay Gandhi acolyte. In another incident, after popular Bollywood singer Kishore Kumar refused to sing at a function of the Indian Youth Congress, his songs were banned on All India Radio upon Gandhi's insistence.

Sanjay stood for his first election to the Indian parliament following the lifting of the Emergency in March 1977. This election saw the crushing defeat of not only Sanjay in his constituency of Amethi but also the wiping out of Indira's Congress party throughout Northern India. However, Sanjay won Amethi for the Congress(I) in the next general election held in January 1980.

Just one month before his death, he was appointed secretary general of the Congress Party in May 1980.

Jama Masjid beautification and slum demolition
Sanjay Gandhi and Brij Vardhan, accompanied by Jagmohan the vice-chairman of Delhi Development Authority (DDA), was reportedly irked during his visit to Turkman Gate in old Delhi area that he couldn't see the grand old Jama Masjid because of the maze of tenements. On 13 April 1976, the DDA team bulldozed the tenements. Police resorted to firing to quell the demonstrations opposing the destruction. The firing resulted in at least 150 deaths. Over 70,000 people were displaced during this episode. The displaced inhabitants were moved to a new undeveloped housing site across the Yamuna river.

Compulsory sterilization program
In September 1976, Sanjay Gandhi initiated a widespread compulsory sterilization program to limit population growth. The exact extent of Sanjay Gandhi's role in the implementation of the program is somewhat disputed, with some writers holding Gandhi directly responsible for his authoritarianism, and other writers blaming the officials who implemented the program rather than Gandhi himself.

David Frum and Vinod Mehta state that the sterilization programmes were initiated at the behest of the IMF and the World Bank:

Attempted assassination
Sanjay Gandhi escaped an assassination attempt in March 1977. Unknown gunmen fired at his car about 300 miles south-east of New Delhi during his election campaign.

Opposition years (1977–1980)
After losing the 1977 general election, the Congress party split again with Indira Gandhi floating her own Congress(I) faction. She won a by-election from the Chikmagalur Constituency to the Lok Sabha in November 1978 However, the Janata government's Home Minister, Charan Singh, ordered her and Sanjay arrested on several charges, none of which would be easy to prove in an Indian court. The arrest meant that Indira Gandhi was automatically expelled from Parliament. However, this strategy backfired disastrously. Her arrest and long-running trial gained her great sympathy from many people.

Kissa Kursi Ka case
Kissa Kursi Ka is a satirical film directed by Amrit Nahata that lampooned Indira Gandhi and Sanjay Gandhi. The film was submitted to the Censor Board for certification in April 1975. The film had lampooned Sanjay Gandhi's car manufacturing plans, besides Congress supporters like Swami Dhirendra Brahmachari, private secretary to Indira Gandhi R.K. Dhawan, and Rukhsana Sultana. The board sent the film to a seven-member revising committee, which further sent it to the Government. Subsequently, a show-cause notice raising 51 objections was sent to the producer by the Information and Broadcasting ministry. In his reply submitted on 11 July 1975, Nahata stated that the characters were "imaginary and do not refer to any political party or persons". By the time, the Emergency had already been declared.

Subsequently, all the prints and the master-print of the film at Censor Board office were picked up, and brought to Maruti factory in Gurgaon where they were burned. The subsequent Shah Commission, established in 1977 by the Janata party led Government of India,  to enquire into excesses committed in the Indian Emergency found Sanjay guilty of burning the negative, along with V. C. Shukla, Information and Broadcasting minister during the emergency. The legal case ran for 11 months, and the court gave its judgment on 27 February 1979. Both Sanjay Gandhi and Shukla were sentenced to a two-year plus a month prison sentence. Sanjay Gandhi was denied bail. In his judgment, District Judge, O. N. Vohra at Tis Hazari in Delhi, found the accused guilty of "criminal conspiracy, breach of trust, mischief by fire, dishonestly receiving criminal property, concealing stolen property and disappearance of evidence". The verdict was later overturned.

Support for Charan Singh
The Janata coalition under prime minister Morarji Desai was only united by its hatred of Indira Gandhi.The party included right wing Hindu Nationalists, Socialists and former Congress party members. With little in common, the Morarji Desai government was bogged down by infighting. In 1979, the government started to unravel over the issue of dual loyalties of some members to Janata and the RSS. The ambitious Union Finance minister, Charan Singh, who as the Union Home Minister during the previous year had ordered arrest of Gandhi, took advantage of this and started courting different Congress factions including Congress (I). After a significant exodus from Janata party to Charan Singh faction, Morarji Desai resigned as prime minister in July 1979. Charan Singh was appointed Prime Minister, by President Reddy, after Indira and Sanjay promised Singh that Congress(I) would support his government from outside on certain conditions. The conditions included dropping all charges against Indira and Sanjay. Since Charan Singh refused to drop the charges, Congress withdrew its support and President Reddy dissolved Parliament in August 1979.

Before the 1980 elections Gandhi approached the then Shahi Imam of Jama Masjid, Syed Abdullah Bukhari and entered into an agreement with him on the basis of 10-point programme to secure the support of the Muslim votes. In the elections held in January, Congress returned to power with a landslide majority.

1980 Indian elections
The Congress(I) under Gandhi swept to power in January 1980. Elections soon after to legislative assemblies in States ruled by opposition parties brought back Congress ministries to those states. Sanjay Gandhi at that time selected his own loyalists to head the governments in these states.

Personal life
Gandhi married Maneka Anand, who was 10 years his junior, in New Delhi on 24 September 1974. Their son, Varun, was born shortly before Gandhi's death. Maneka and Varun represent the Bharatiya Janata Party (BJP) in the Lok Sabha.

A hitherto unknown chapter of his personal life was revealed in January 2017, when Priya Singh Paul claimed that Gandhi was her biological father, and that she was given away by her biological family for adoption. In June 2017, she gave a legal notice in her capacity as his daughter to stop the release of a film on Gandhi.

Death
Gandhi died instantly from head wounds in an air crash at 8:10 a.m. on 23 June 1980, near Safdarjung Airport in New Delhi. He was flying a new aircraft of the Delhi Flying Club, and, while performing an aerobatic manoeuvre over his office, lost control and crashed. Gandhi was a novice pilot but given to flashy daredevilry and dangerous low-flying. His brother had repeatedly warned Gandhi to wear proper shoes and not Kolhapuri chappals in the cockpit but Gandhi chose to ignore his advice. He was clad in kurta-pajama and Kolhapuri chappal when he got into the advanced Pitts S-2A aircraft. Before reaching the recommended minimum height of 5,000 feet, Gandhi indulged in some reckless maneuvers. The engine of the biplane apparently stalled before it crashed. Gandhi died instantly. It took eight surgeons four hours to stitch up his mutilated body.

The only other passenger in the plane was a flight instructor Captain Subhash Saxena, who also died in the crash. WikiLeaks has revealed that three attempts were made on Sanjay's life before he died in the plane crash.

According to his wife, Gandhi wanted to raise his children in the Zoroastrian faith of his family.

The death of Gandhi impacted the political face of India. Gandhi's death led his mother to induct her other son Rajiv into politics. After the assassination of Indira Gandhi, Rajiv succeeded her as Prime Minister of India. Gandhi's widow Maneka fell out with her in-laws soon after Gandhi's death and started her own party named Sanjay Vichar Manch in Hyderabad. Maneka served in a number of non-Congress opposition-led governments over the years. Currently, she and her son Varun are members of the BJP, which is the current ruling party in India. Maneka was appointed to the cabinet as Minister of Women and Child Development by Prime Minister Narendra Modi in May 2014, she currently represents BJP from Sultanpur (Lok Sabha constituency) in Uttar Pradesh. Varun is a BJP member of Parliament from Pilibhit constituency in Uttar Pradesh.

Family

References

External links

 

1946 births
1980 deaths
People from Sultanpur, Uttar Pradesh
Indian National Congress politicians
Children of prime ministers of India
India MPs 1980–1984
Lok Sabha members from Uttar Pradesh
People of the Emergency (India)
Accidental deaths in India
Aviators killed in aviation accidents or incidents in India
Victims of aviation accidents or incidents in 1980
St. Columba's School, Delhi alumni
The Doon School alumni
Nehru–Gandhi family
Parsi people
Ecole d'Humanité alumni